Simge is a Turkish given name for females, meaning symbol. Notable people with the name include:

 Simge Sağın (born 1981), Turkish singer
 Simge Tertemiz (born 1988), Turkish model and TV hostess

Turkish feminine given names